Wola Rusinowska  is a village in the administrative district of Gmina Majdan Królewski, within Kolbuszowa County, Subcarpathian Voivodeship, in south-eastern Poland.

The village has a population of 1,013.

References

Wola Rusinowska